While No One Is Watching is a 2013 Swedish documentary film about sexual violence against children and the people fighting to stop it, directed by  and David Herdies. The film is produced by Momento Film in a cooperation with ECPAT Sweden.

In October 2013, the film was screened privately for politicians and government officials, followed by a panel discussion led by Swedish Minister of Foreign Affairs, Margot Wallström.

The cinematography is by Camilla Skagerström.

References

External links
 
 
 While No One Is Watching at The Swedish Film Institute Database

Documentary films about pedophilia
Swedish documentary films
2013 films
2013 documentary films
2010s Swedish films